Vanilla Ice Is Back! is a cover album by the rapper Vanilla Ice. Released in 2008 by Cleopatra Records, it is a cover album containing covers of several popular hip hop tracks, as well as one reggae selection: "Buffalo Soldier", originally performed by Bob Marley.

Production and release
Vanilla Ice chose most of the songs for the record, but he says he had no creative control over the production process.  The album was first released as a digital download on November 4, 2008, and on digital compact disc on November 11, 2008. 

The cover is modeled after that of Elvis Presley's 1960 album Elvis Is Back!.

Reception

IGN reviewer Spence Abbott wrote: "From uninspired nu metal interpretations to thin voiced funk interpretations on down to the poor synth break beats, [the album] is an embarrassing endeavor that sounds like it should have stayed locked inside Ice's studio (or at the very least leaked on YouTube and passed off as a piss take)."

Track listing

Samples
Buffalo Soldier
"Change the Beat (Female Version)" by Beside
Insane in the Brain
"Hits From the Bong" by Cypress Hill

References

Covers albums
Vanilla Ice remix albums
2008 remix albums
Cleopatra Records albums